Sacky may refer to:

 Sacky Nangula, councillor of Omuntele Constituency, Namibia
 Sacky Shanghala, Attorney General of Namibia since 2015
 nickname of William Glen (footballer) (1903–1981), Irish footballer